Urban Freeflow (often abbreviated to UF) is a UK-based parkour and freerunning related company that was founded in 2003.

After the original founder lost interest, four German parkour athletes took over the brand-name and the official URL.

History
Established in 2003, Urban Freeflow was founded by Paul Corkery (known as Ez), a former boxer who saw an opportunity to connect the international parkour community through an online forum. As the first mover, the company managed to be profitable as the momentum of parkour and its popularity grew.

The corporate structure of the group was compromised in 2005 when Companies House dissolved the trading company for failing to meet their statutory filing obligations. At this time, Ez and former partner Mark Toorock (M2) split and Ez formed a new company, Urban Free Flow. The company sold branded clothes, many of which feature the Urban Freeflow trademarked Glyph logo.

Urban Freeflow was criticised for organizing freerunning competitions sponsored by Barclaycard. The critics believed that freerunning, like parkour, should be a non-competitive activity. There are also complaints of the corporate nature of the event, many freerunning sites saying that the introduction of merchandising and sponsorships would compromise the true nature of the sport. To this one of the founders of Urban Freeflow, Ez has replied "The people who are saying this are the ones who don't have any sponsorship."

See also
Jump Britain – a 2005 documentary about freerunning that includes members of Urban Freeflow

References

Parkour
Companies established in 2003
Clothing companies of the United Kingdom